Ram Aur Shyam is a 1996 Hindi Action film of Bollywood directed and produced by Raju Mavani. This movie was released on 20 December 1996 under the banner of Jay Raj Productions. This is the debut film of actor Samrat Mukerji.

Plot 
Scientist Roshni Raman has discovered an important scientific formula. But she was abducted by the gang of "Jabar" and subsequently taken by force by "Tatar", another anti-national Don. Tatar is a very powerful person who has the police and politicians on his payroll. Roshni's mother could not be satisfied by the activities of the police and appoints a young fellow, "Ram", to locate and rescue Roshni. On the other hand, Jabar hires Shyam to find Roshni and bring her to him. Both men must now not only confront each other, but also the invincible Tatar.

Cast 
 Samrat Mukerji as Ram
 Manek Bedi as Shyam
 Om Puri as DIG
 Divya Dutta as Sunaina
 Kanchan as Ram's girlfriend
 Danny Denzongpa as Tatar
 Mukesh Rishi as Jabar
 Avtar Gill as Minister
 Rohini Hattangadi as Mrs. Raman
 Tinnu Anand as Banjara leader
 Deepak Shirke as Bhaktwar

Music
"Ajab Ho Tum" - Kumar Sanu, Alka Yagnik
"Bindu Re Bindu" - Anu Malik, Parveen Saba
"Ek Nazar Dekha Tujhe" - Kumar Sanu, Alka Yagnik
"Pyar Kis Se Karen" - Kumar Sanu
"Sajna Tere Bina" - Sadhana Sargam, Poornima
"Yaad Piya Ki Aaye" - Udit Narayan, Poornima

References

External links
 

1996 films
Films scored by Anu Malik
1990s Hindi-language films
Indian action films
1996 action films
Hindi-language action films